Kurkino may refer to:
Kurkino District, a district in the North-Western Administrative Okrug of Moscow, Russia
Kurkino (inhabited locality), name of several inhabited localities in Russia